Edmunds-Heptinstall House is a historic plantation house located near Aurelian Springs, Halifax County, North Carolina. It dates to the 1830s or 1840s, and is a tall two-story, transitional Federal / Greek Revival-style frame dwelling.  It measures 35 feet by 35 feet, rests on a stuccoed masonry foundation, side gable roof, two tall single-shoulder stone chimneys, and a side-hall plan.

It was listed on the National Register of Historic Places in 1979.

References

Plantation houses in North Carolina
Houses on the National Register of Historic Places in North Carolina
Federal architecture in North Carolina
Greek Revival houses in North Carolina
Houses in Halifax County, North Carolina
National Register of Historic Places in Halifax County, North Carolina